Ross Rayburn is a fictional character from the ABC soap opera One Life to Live. The role was originated by Shawn Christian from June 11 to September 17, 2002. Michael Lowry portrayed the role from August 28, 2009 to December 14, 2009, from January 8 to 13, 2010 and on April 29, 2010. Billy Warlock took over the role on August 27, 2010 and left on October 8, 2010.

Storylines
Ross Rayburn is hired by Todd Manning in 2002. Todd needs his help in a plan to kidnap his children, Starr and Jack Manning. The plan fails when Téa Delgado tells Todd's ex-wife Blair about it. Ross, Todd and Téa end up shipwrecked on a deserted island. Ross falls for Téa, and Todd's romantic feelings for her resurface. Ross manages to pull her into a kiss, which Todd witnesses and then leaves. He and Téa later reconcile and have sex for the first time, but he soon leaves Ross and Téa stranded on the island while he returns to Llanview. Ross is not heard from again until 2009, when he sends his lawyer, Elijah Clark, to Llanview to warn Téa. Elijah is eventually revealed to be Ross' brother. Blair begins looking into Téa's life after the island and finds that there is nothing to see. She goes to Tahiti to track down Ross, who is living under the alias Ross Raymond, to get the full story from him. It turns out that Ross and Téa did not go their separate ways after they were rescued off the island. Instead, the two married and had a life, complete with daughter Dani, together in Tahiti. Blair convinces him to set up fake divorce papers for Téa and to come with her to Llanview. The plan is to stop Todd and Téa's pending nuptials; but after Dorian Lord pays him to make sure the wedding happens, Ross kidnaps Blair. When the two finally make it back to land, though she is upset with Ross, she carries out her plan and tells Todd Manning that his marriage to Téa is invalid. Ross later tells her that she only has half the story. Blair tries to force Téa to tell her that she has a child with Todd. He soon develops romantic feelings for Blair, who is too stuck on Todd to notice.

Téa eventually tells Ross Dani is Todd's biological daughter. On December 7, 2009, he kidnaps Danielle Rayburn and Blair Cramer just to be with his daughter and in Blair's car. On December 14, 2009, while he and Todd fight over a gun, Todd pushes Ross off a bridge. He is declared legally dead, though his body is never found.

Dani takes Bo Buchanan's gun and tries to kill Todd, blaming him for Ross's death. Realizing how traumatized her daughter is from losing her father, Téa takes Dani back home to Tahiti, to mourn Ross's death.  While they are there, Ross reveals he is alive. He tells Dani that Todd is her father, proving to Téa how much he loves Dani. Dani is devastated and Ross comforts her telling her he is the lucky one since he got to raise and love Dani from birth.  He points out that Todd didn't have that chance.  After she finally takes this in, Téa makes Dani a deal:  they can let everyone believe Ross is dead so he can live free in Tahiti, if Dani comes back to Llanview with Téa.  Ross encourages her to go and Dani promises she will one day return home to Ross, who she maintains is her father regardless of DNA. Ross, in turn, promises to wait for her.

He appears in a hallucination of Todd's in April, 2010. He is depicted remarrying Téa.

In Tahiti, Blair and Eli marry with Ross as a witness. After the ceremony, she learns Eli has murdered 2 wives, Melinda Cramer, mental patient Rodney, and a records clerk. Eli and Blair fight over a gun, which is loaded with blanks, unbeknownst to Blair. She "shoots" Eli, who starts a fire with candles and apparently dies. However, the burned body was planted by Ross, who wants to help his brother.

When Téa apparently dies from a brain tumor Ross returns to Llanview in the hopes of getting his "daughter" back. Before his brother Eli had "died," Eli had forged Téa's will so that Ross had sole custody of Dani. When Ross appears with the will at Todd's house, Todd calls John McBain to have him arrested but learns that the Seattle Police Department doesn't want Ross anymore because the charges against him for the kidnapping of Blair and Dani were dropped thanks to the help of Elijah. Blair and Todd put on a front for Dani to appear to be nice to Ross and even offer to set him up at the Palace Hotel for the time being but are secretly setting up to destroy him in court. The next day at Téa's memorial service Ross meets Dani's new boyfriend Nate Salinger. He is also confronted by Todd with a gun, and offers to pay him as much money as he wants to get rid of Ross but he doesn't budge and Blair stops Todd from killing Ross. Ross receives custody of Dani, thanks to lies about Tea's last wishes told by Dr. Greg Evans. Daniella runs away with the help of the 3 Ford brothers and Starr.

In October 2010, while arguing on the docks, serial murderer Elijah Clarke reveals to his brother Ross that he is behind Tea's (presumed at the time) death. Ross is shot by Eli and is pushed into the Llantano River. Todd arrives and fights with Eli, who escapes with a gun. Ross appears from under the water. He tries to climb onto the dock and Todd assists him because of Dani's love for Ross. Ross tells Todd that Eli is seeking runaway Daniella. Dani appears on the dock and sees Todd holding a gun and sitting over the body of Ross Rayburn.

External links
Ross Rayburn profile – Soaps.com
"All About Ross Rayburn" – SOAPnet.com
Ross Rayburn profile – SoapCentral.com
Llanview Labyrinth – Ross Rayburn

One Life to Live characters
Television characters introduced in 2002
Fictional criminals in soap operas